The 1909–10 season was the 16th in the history of Southern Football League. Brighton & Hove Albion won Division One for the first time, Stoke and Hastings & St Leonards finished top of the Division Two groups, though they were not promoted to Division One. Stoke were the only club to apply for election to the Football League, but were unsuccessful.

Division One

A total of 22 teams contest the division, including 21 sides from previous season and one new team.

Team promoted from 1908–09 Division Two:
 Croydon Common

Division Two A

All the clubs in the new Division Two A were new to the Southern League, except Salisbury City participated in league since 1906.

Division Two B

A total of six teams contest the division, including 3 sides from previous season Division Two and three new teams, all of them are newly elected teams.Newly elected teams:'''
 Kettering
 Peterborough City
 Romford

Football League elections
Stoke were the only Southern League club to apply for election to the Football League, but received only three votes.

References

1909-10
1909–10 in English association football leagues
1909–10 in Welsh football